Nigel Peter Weatherill FIMA, C.Math, FRAeS, C.Eng, C.Sci, FREng, DL is the former Vice-Chancellor and Chief Executive of Liverpool John Moores University. Prior to this he had been Pro-Vice-Chancellor for Research and Head of the School of Engineering at the University of Swansea, then later Pro-Vice-Chancellor and Head of the College of Engineering and Physical Science at the University of Birmingham.
 
Weatherill is a Fellow of the Royal Aeronautical Society and the Institute of Mathematics and Its Applications, as well as a Companion of the Chartered Management Institute. He is a Chartered Mathematician, a Chartered Engineer and Chartered Scientist. In 1996 he was awarded a D.Sc from the University of Southampton for his work on computational fluid dynamics and in 2003 he was elected a Fellow of the Royal Academy of Engineering and a Fellow of the Royal Society of Arts in 2012. He is also a Deputy Lieutenant of Merseyside.

Family and education
Nigel Weatherill was born in Cleckheaton, Yorkshire. He is married to his wife Barbara Weatherill. Together they have 2 children, George and Laura. His interests include fly-fishing, hill walking and art.

He attended Whitcliffe Mount Grammar School. Afterwards he attended the University of Southampton where he obtained an undergraduate and postgraduate in Mathematics and Aeronautics. He later obtained a Ph.D from the university's department of mathematics for his work on magnetohydrodynamics.

Early career
After leaving university, Weatherill joined a research team part of the Anglian Water Authority developing mathematical models to predict the water quality in rivers and estuaries, then later undertook work into compressible high-speed flows in aeronautics at the Aircraft Research Association, Bedford. In 1986 he was a research fellow at the Department of Mechanical and Aerospace Engineering at Princeton University in the US.

Swansea University 
After returning to the UK, Weatherill was appointed lecturer in the Department of Civil Engineering at the University of Swansea in 1987. In 1995 he was appointed to a personal chair before becoming the head of department in 1996. In 2001 Weatherill was appointed Adjunct Professor at the US Nation Science Foundation Engineering Research Centre in Mississippi, spending a year at Mississippi State University. When Swansea University Department of Engineering was integrated in 2001, Weatherill was made head of the School of Engineering, a position he held until 2007. In 2002 he became Pro-Vice-Chancellor (Research). Between 2008 and 2011 he was Scientist-In-Residence at the Institute for High Performance Computing in Singapore.

Birmingham University 
In 2008 he moved to the University of Birmingham, where he was Pro-Vice-Chancellor and head of the College of Engineering and Physical Science. While at Birmingham he was the Executive directory of the National Higher Education STEM Programme for England and Wales - a project aimed at promoting and widening access to Higher Education in STEM disciplines, innovative curriculum development and STEM skills for employment. He was also a member of the founding group of the Manufacturing Technology Centre, now part of the High Value Manufacturing Catapult.

Between 1998 and 2011 he was Co-Editor-In-Chief of the International Journal for Numerical Methods in Fluids, published by Wiley. His main research interests are high speed compressible flows of relevance to aerospace engineering, as well as aspects of electromagnetism, environmental modelling and bio-engineering. In total Weatherill has had more than 300 publications in journals and conference papers.

Vice Chancellor at Liverpool John Moores University

On 1 September 2011, Nigel Weatherill was appointed Vice-Chancellor of Liverpool John Moores University (LJMU) replacing the outgoing Michael Bown.

During this time Weatherill held a number of additional honorary positions and roles; an Honorary Colonel of the Liverpool University Officer Training Corps (2013 to 2018), an Honorary Member of the Liverpool Medical Institute (2017), an Honorary Friend of Liverpool Institute for Performing Arts (2018) and an Honorary Fellow of the Manufacturing Technology Centre (2018). In 2014 he was appointed to chair the Mayoral Commission on Environmental Sustainability by the Elected Mayor of Liverpool. Weatherill was appointed as Chair of the Royal Liverpool Philharmonic in November 2015, as well as Vice-Chair of the Liverpool Royal Court Theatre, eventually becoming Chair in October 2018. 

Weatherill retired from the role of Vice Chancellor, after a tenure of 7 years, in September 2018. LJMU Pro-Chancellor and Chair of Governors, Rod Hill, announced:  "Following discussions between the Board of Governors and the Vice-Chancellor, Professor Nigel Weatherill has confirmed to me as Chair of the Board that he intends to step down as Vice-Chancellor and Chief Executive of Liverpool John Moores University with immediate effect". Mr Hill further stated ' After seven years under Professor Weatherill's leadership, the University has achieved excellent student recruitment, an enhanced student experience, new academic partnerships at home and abroad, and an increased focus on research and scholarship LJMU is therefore in a strong position to move forward being well resourced and financially sound.' 

No reasons were given, although the Liverpool Echo newspaper reported, "The ECHO understands Prof. Weatherill has not chosen to retire". The LJMU release added that: "The business of the University will continue without delay or distraction under the leadership of Mark Power, Registrar, Secretary and Deputy Chief Executive, who will assume the title of Interim Head of Institution and Chief Executive". The Times Higher Education Supplement (THES) commented that, "LJMU's finance director preceded V-C out of LJMU exit door: the University declines to comment on factors behind pair of sudden departures"

Retirement 

Following his retirement from LJMU he was appointed as Chair of the North West Region Advisory Board of the Canal and River Trust in 2019. He is a member of the Education Committee of The Honourable Society of Middle Temple, Chair of the Board of Crimestoppers for Merseyside, is a member of the Arts Council (North), a Trustee of the Liverpool Medical Institution, a Board Member of the cancer charity Maggie's at Clatterbridge and a Patron of the Hope Opportunity Trust.

References

Vice-Chancellors of Liverpool John Moores University
Academics of the University of Birmingham
Academics of Swansea University
Alumni of the University of Southampton
English civil engineers
Living people
British academic administrators
Deputy Lieutenants of Merseyside
Fellows of the Royal Aeronautical Society
Fellows of the Institute of Mathematics and its Applications
Fellows of the Royal Academy of Engineering
Princeton University fellows
Year of birth missing (living people)
People from Cleckheaton